Aghuz Kaleh or Aghuz Keleh or Aghuz Kalleh may refer to:
 Aghuz Keleh, Fuman, Gilan Province
 Aghuz Kalleh, Rudsar, Gilan Province
 Aghuz Kaleh, Mazandaran